Psychology, Crime & Law is a peer-reviewed academic journal covering forensic psychology. It was established in 1994 and is published 10 times per year by Taylor & Francis on behalf of the European Association of Psychology and Law, of which it is the official journal. The editor-in-chief is Theresa Gannon (University of Kent). According to the Journal Citation Reports, the journal has a 2017 impact factor of 1.598.

References

External links

Forensic psychology journals
Publications established in 1994
Taylor & Francis academic journals
Academic journals associated with international learned and professional societies of Europe
English-language journals
10 times per year journals